Capricon is a science fiction convention held annually in the Chicago area.  It is sponsored by Phandemonium and has been held each year since 1981.

This article provides a listing of all Capricons, detailing their dates, locations, chairpersons, guests and (starting in 1999) the themes of each convention.

Except where indicated otherwise, all information is taken from the "History of Capricon" page at Capricon's web site.

References

External links

Phandemonium, Inc.

Science fiction conventions in the United States
Festivals in Illinois
Festivals in Chicago
Recurring events established in 1981
Conventions in Illinois